Bohner Stream is a meltwater stream,  long, flowing north from the south end of Sollas Glacier to Priscu Stream in Taylor Valley, Victoria Land. It was named by the Advisory Committee on Antarctic Names in 1996 after Lieutenant Commander Robert T. (Beez) Bohner, U.S. Navy, helicopter pilot, Squadron VXE-6, who flew Antarctic missions from 1986; was liaison with the National Science Foundation, 1989–91; and organized the first spring (WINFLY) helicopter flights to McMurdo Dry Valleys in 1991.

References
 

Rivers of Victoria Land
McMurdo Dry Valleys